Group B of the 2000 Fed Cup Europe/Africa Zone Group II was one of four pools in the Europe/Africa zone of the 2000 Fed Cup. Five teams competed in a round robin competition, with the top team advancing to Group I for 2001.

Denmark vs. Liechtenstein

Bosnia and Herzegovina vs. Iceland

Tunisia vs. Botswana

Denmark vs. Botswana

Bosnia and Herzegovina vs. Tunisia

Liechtenstein vs. Iceland

Denmark vs. Iceland

Bosnia and Herzegovina vs. Botswana

Tunisia vs. Liechtenstein

Denmark vs. Bosnia and Herzegovina

Tunisia vs. Iceland

Liechtenstein vs. Botswana

Denmark vs. Tunisia

Bosnia and Herzegovina vs. Liechtenstein

Botswana vs. Iceland

  placed first in this group and thus advanced to Group I for 2001, where they placed last in their pool of five, and was thus relegated back to Group II for 2002.

See also
Fed Cup structure

References

External links
 Fed Cup website

2000 Fed Cup Europe/Africa Zone